Jay James may refer to:

 Jason James (musician) (born 1981), Welsh musician, bassist for the Welsh Metalcore band Bullet for My Valentine from 2003 to 2015

See also
 Jason James (disambiguation)